Shekaft (also known as Seguft and Seqaft) is a village in Kuh Mareh Sorkhi Rural District, Arzhan District, Shiraz County, Fars Province, Iran. As of the 2006 Iranian national census, its population is 613, with 131 families.

References 

Populated places in Shiraz County